Gracixalus carinensis, also known as the Burmese bubble-nest frog, brown Carin tree frog and Karin Hills bush frog, is a species of frog in the family Rhacophoridae from Thailand, Burma, and Vietnam.

References

carinensis
Amphibians described in 1893
Amphibians of Thailand
Amphibians of Myanmar
Amphibians of Vietnam